Mooa is a small islet of the Shetland Islands of Scotland, situated roughly  east off the coast of Whalsay. It lies to the north of Isbister Holm and south of Nista.

References

Islets of Whalsay
Uninhabited islands of Shetland